Oscar's Grind is a betting strategy used by gamblers on wagers where the outcome is evenly distributed between two results of equal value (like flipping a coin). It is an archetypal positive progression strategy. It is also called Hoyle's Press. In German and French it is often referred to as the Pluscoup Progression. It was first documented by Allan Wilson in his 1965 book, The Casino Gambler's Guide. This progression is based on calculating the size of bets so that in the event of a losing streak, if and when a same-length winning streak occurs, a profit is obtained. The main concept is that there are periods of many wins and periods of many losses. Losses and wins often come in streaks. Ideally, bets are kept low on losing streaks and increased on winning streaks, which hopefully will follow.

Description

Oscar's Grind divides the entire gambling event into sessions. A session is a sequence of consecutive wagers made until 1 unit of profit is won. Each session begins by betting 1 unit, and ends by winning 1 unit of profit. If the gambler loses, the session continues and the bet is repeated. Each time the gambler wins the game following a lost game, the bet is increased by 1 unit. This increase is not performed if the current bet warrants achieving at least 1 unit of profit in total, in case the next game is won. On the contrary, the bet size in such a situation should be decreased to assure exactly 1 unit is won.

Algorithm
 unit := 1
 betsize := unit
 profit := 0
 
 repeat
     bet
     if bet_won then
         profit := profit + betsize
         if profit < unit then
             if profit + betsize + unit > unit then
                 betsize := unit − profit
             else
                 betsize := betsize + unit
     else
         profit := profit − betsize
 until profit = unit

Example

Analysis

Oscar's Grind is the same as Martingale-based and Labouchère system in the sense that if you have an infinite amount to wager and time, every session will make a profit. Not meeting these conditions will result in an inevitable loss of your entire stake in the long run. You can only lose 500 times in a row from a 500 unit bankroll, and if occasional wins increase the betsize, this number decreases significantly. Oscar's Grind is based on losing streaks being "compensated" by winning streaks in the short run, and in the example above, a 5-long losing streak was equalised by a 3-long winning streak. If we get 'compensated' with a 5-long winning streak, we get 3 units of profit. The base of the system originates in a hot-hand bias, but winning and losing streaks in gambling have no mathematical ground or proof.

Variations

Oscar's Grind can be applied to non-even bets as well ("streets" in roulette or "doubling" in blackjack); one just has to keep track of the amount and increase the betsize after wins accordingly. There are also variations that try to reduce the variance by waiting for a couple of wins before increasing the betsize. As it is with all betting progressions, no variation of Oscar's Grind will make a profit in the long run.

See also
 Gambler's Fallacy

References

Betting systems
Roulette and wheel games
Gambling terminology